The Norris Forest School Arboretum 160 acres (0.6 km²) is an arboretum located four miles (6 km) south of Hickman, Nebraska, and extends all around the grade school, middle school and high school buildings of the Norris School District.

The Arboretum contains a collection of approximately 400 trees and shrubs representing over 90 species, as well as a display of native grasses and plants, annual and perennial flowers, and a learning center (gazebo).

See also 
 List of botanical gardens in the United States

External links
Norris Forest School Arboretum

Botanical gardens in Nebraska
Arboreta in Nebraska
Protected areas of Lancaster County, Nebraska